XHFW-FM/XEFW-AM is a radio station in Tampico, operating on 88.5 FM. It's owned and operated by Multimedios Radio. 810 AM is a United States clear-channel frequency; KGO and WGY share Class A status on this frequency.

History
XEFW-AM 1240 received its concession in 1932. The 70-watt station owned by José Expedito Martínez until 1937, when the Flores family entered broadcasting by way of a joint partnership with Martínez. XEFW later moved to 810 kHz and ramped up its power to 50,000 watts day and night, earning it the distinction of being a border blaster in the eyes of some.

In the 1980s, XEFW cut its power back to 10,000 watts day and a mere 250 watts at night, later boosted back to 50,000/1,000. The station was now exclusively owned by the Flores family, which had built a local cluster featuring XEFW, AM sister XETW-AM 860, XHON-FM 96.1, and XHFW-TV channel 9.

In 2011, the Flores family took advantage of the government's program to migrate AM stations to FM and converted XEFW into XHFW-FM broadcasting on 106.3 MHz. XHFW was known as La Estrella.

In 2016, the Flores family ceded operation of its radio stations to Multimedios Radio, which converted them to their own formats. XHFW was given the Hits FM pop format. On April 26, 2018, XHFW-FM moved to 88.5 MHz in order to clear 106-108 MHz for community and indigenous stations, as a condition of the renewal of its concession in 2017.

On April 25, 2018, the Federal Telecommunications Institute approved the transfer of XHFW-FM to Radio Centinela, S.A. de C.V., a direct subsidiary of Multimedios Radio.

See also
Border blaster

References

External links
Border Radio by Fowler, Gene and Crawford, Bill.  Texas Monthly Press, Austin. 1987 
Mass Media Moments in the United Kingdom, the USSR and the USA, by Gilder, Eric. - "Lucian Blaga" University of Sibiu Press, Romania. 2003 
Dedication of the Wolfman Jack Memorial in Del Rio, Texas

Radio stations in Tampico
Multimedios Radio
Radio stations in Mexico with continuity obligations